Blue Hole Park is lagoon and park along the South Fork of the San Gabriel River, in Georgetown, Texas, United States.

References

External links
 

Georgetown, Texas